Liberal Democratic Party leadership election may refer to:

 2006 Liberal Democratic Party (Japan) leadership election
 2007 Liberal Democratic Party (Japan) leadership election
 2008 Liberal Democratic Party (Japan) leadership election
 2009 Liberal Democratic Party (Japan) leadership election

See also
 Liberal Democrats leadership election (disambiguation)